Bihardancsháza is a village in Hajdú-Bihar county, in the Northern Great Plain region of eastern Hungary.

Geography
It has a population of 172 people (2015).

References

Populated places in Hajdú-Bihar County